Long Khánh is former province in the Southeast Region (Đông Nam Bộ region) of former South Vietnam. It was established on October 22, 1956, by separating from Biên Hòa province. 

On April 24, 1957, it had two districts established, Xuân Lộc District and Định Quán District.

On April 30, 1975, the province was renamed Đồng Nai province, within newly unified Vietnam.

Former provinces of Vietnam
Southeast (Vietnam)
Provinces of South Vietnam
1956 establishments in South Vietnam